The men's javelin throw event at the 2006 World Junior Championships in Athletics was held in Beijing, China, at Chaoyang Sports Centre on 16 and 19 August.

Medalists

Results

Final
19 August

Qualifications
16 August

Group A

Group B

Participation
According to an unofficial count, 34 athletes from 26 countries participated in the event.

References

Javelin throw
Javelin throw at the World Athletics U20 Championships